Jawai Maaza Bhala (Marathi: जावई माझा भला; translation: My Good Son-in-law) is a Marathi film that was released on 16 March 2008. The film was written by Ratnakar Matkari, directed by Adwait Dadarkar and presented by KalaShri Boston. The film stars Vikram Gokhale, Amita Khopkar, Jayant Savarkar, Sujata Joshi and Rajashri Tope.

The film is based on a what a father goes through just before his daughter marries.

Synopsis
A simple man raises his children with utmost sincerity. Most of his life he works as a senior accountant and performs his homely duties as required.

On his 50th birthday, his daughter announces that she wants to marry the son of a rich businessman. On hearing this news, her father rejects their union, solely because he doesn't believe some other man could take better care of his daughter. Thus begins the efforts of family to convince father for the wedding.

This film is a drama with light humor.

Cast
 Vikram Gokhale
 Amita Khopkar
 Jayant Savarkar
 Sujata Joshi
 Rajashri Tope

Crew
Writer - Ratnakar Matkari
Director - Adwait Dadarkar
Producer - KalaShri Boston

References

External links
 'Show details - Boston
 

2008 films
2000s Marathi-language films